Portovelo Curipamba is a town in the El Oro Province of Ecuador.

References

Populated places in El Oro Province